Gilonne Guigonnat (born 26 November 1998) is a French biathlete.

She is the sister of biathlete Antonin Guigonnat.

Career 
Gilonne Guigonnat is a bronze medalist in pursuit at the 2023 IBU Open European Championships in Lenzerheide. She also won the Women's Mass Start 60 and came second in the Women's 10 km pursuit at the 2022-23 Biathlon IBU Cup.

References 

Living people
1998 births
Grenoble Alpes University alumni
French female biathletes
IBU template using Wikidata